Porphyrochroa is a genus of flies in the family Empididae.

Species
P. aliena Mendonça, Rafael & Ale-Rocha, 2008
P. amazonica Mendonça, Rafael & Ale-Rocha, 2008
P. argentata Rafael & Ale-Rocha, 2002
P. bifida Mendonça, Rafael & Ale-Rocha, 2008
P. cercosingularis Mendonça, Rafael & Ale-Rocha, 2008
P. dactiliodes Mendonça, Rafael & Ale-Rocha, 2008
P. distincta Mendonça, Rafael & Ale-Rocha, 2008
P. dominicanensis Rafael & Ale-Rocha, 2002
P. elongata Mendonça, Rafael & Ale-Rocha, 2007
P. amazonica Mendonça, Rafael & Ale-Rocha, 2008
P. epandrialis Mendonça, Rafael & Ale-Rocha, 2008
P. genalis Rafael & Ale-Rocha, 2002
P. grandis Mendonça, Rafael & Ale-Rocha, 2008
P. hipandriociliaris Mendonça, Rafael & Ale-Rocha, 2007
P. latifrons Rafael & Ale-Rocha, 2002
P. longiseta Mendonça, Rafael & Ale-Rocha, 2008
P. manauara Mendonça, Rafael & Ale-Rocha, 2008
P. neblina Mendonça, Rafael & Ale-Rocha, 2008
P. pacaraima Mendonça, Rafael & Ale-Rocha, 2008
P. palliata (Coquillett, 1902)
P. pectinata Rafael & Ale-Rocha, 2002
P. platypoderis Mendonça, Rafael & Ale-Rocha, 2008
P. quadrilamelaris Mendonça, Rafael & Ale-Rocha, 2008
P. roraimensis Mendonça, Rafael & Ale-Rocha, 2008
P. simplex Mendonça, Rafael & Ale-Rocha, 2008
P. vidali Mendonça, Rafael & Ale-Rocha, 2007
P. xavieri Mendonça, Rafael & Ale-Rocha, 2008

References

Empidoidea genera
Empididae